Dia (Jà) is a small town and seat of the commune of Diaka in the Cercle of Ténenkou in the Mopti Region of southern-central Mali.

Tomo Kan and also some Fulfulde are spoken in Dia.

According to Levtzion, the Diakhanke "remember Dia in Massina as the town of their ancestor, Suware, a great marabout and a saint."

Local surnames include Sangaré, Cissé, Sidibé.

The three settlement mound complex, near the Inland Niger Delta, predates Djenne and Timbuktu. Dia-Shoma, as the earliest settlement mound, dates to the 9th century BCE. Dia-Mara dates to sixth century CE. The height of settlement at this complex is reached around the tenth century CE.

References

Further reading
.
.
.
.

Populated places in Mopti Region
Archaeological sites in Mali